The ÇOMÜ Faculty of Theology is one of the professional faculties at the Çanakkale Onsekiz Mart University, ÇOMÜ. Its name in Turkish language is 'İlahiyat fakültesi'. The ÇOMÜ Faculty of Theology, which was established in 1995, aims to conduct academic research in the field of Islamic religious studies at undergraduate and postgraduate levels and train professional individuals as teachers and researchers of religion, to be employed by state and private schools providing formal and non-formal education.

One of the objectives of the Faculty is to educate the nation in the field of Islamic and religious studies.

The Faculty of Theology is located on the lower Terzioğlu Campus of the University. The faculty has three departments and also participates in interdisciplinary courses and projects.

Departments 

The Faculty of Theology comprises three departments:
 Fundamental Islamic Studies
 Philosophy and Religious Studies
 Islamic History and Arts

Location 

The Faculty of Law lies at the geographic centre of Çanakkale and Kepez town by the Çanakkale Straits. It is only 50 metres away from the sea. It is located at the corner of the ÇOMÜ terzioğlu Campus. The city town airport is 5 minutes away from the Faculty.

Fast Facts 
 Name: University of Çanakkale Onsekiz Mart Faculty of Theology
 Established: 1992
 Type: Public
 Head: Pof. Dr. Abdurrahman Kuzu
 City: Çanakkale
 Country: Turkey
 Faculty: 50 full-time, 20 adjunct, 12 visiting
 Students: Approximately 500
 Campus: Urban

See also
 Çanakkale Onsekiz Mart University

External links
 Faculty of Theology website

Theology
Educational institutions established in 1995
1995 establishments in Turkey